Sinkolo is a village and rural commune in the Cercle of Koutiala in the Sikasso Region of southern Mali. The commune covers an area of 296 square kilometers and includes 9 villages. In the 2009 census it had a population of 11,470. The village of Sinkolo, the administrative centre (chef-lieu) of the commune, is 35 km south-southwest of Koutiala.

References

External links
.

Communes of Sikasso Region